And Nothing Hurt is the eighth studio album by Spiritualized. The album was released on 7 September 2018 through Fat Possum Records in the United States and Bella Union in the United Kingdom, and is the band's first album in six years since 2012's Sweet Heart Sweet Light. The album was announced on 11 June 2018, along with the release of the album's first singles, "I'm Your Man" and "A Perfect Miracle". The album was produced by Jason Pierce.

Everything Was Beautiful, the band's ninth studio album released in 2022, is intended to be a companion piece to And Nothing Hurt and was created from the same demo sessions as that album. When both album titles are combined, they form the quote "Everything Was Beautiful and Nothing Hurt", taken from the 1969 novel Slaughterhouse-Five by Kurt Vonnegut.

Track listing

Personnel 
Musicians

 J. Spaceman – Fender Thinline, Fender Jazzmaster, Gibson L-00, Fender Bass VI, Burns Sonic Bass, Gibson Firebird III, Farfisa, Vox Continental, Juno-60, Radioshack 100, harmonica, glockenspiel
 Tony Foster – Gibson Black Beauty, Fender Jazzmaster, harmonica, Rickenbacker lap steel, Epiphone Batwing
 James Stelfox – Fender Precision Bass, Fender Jazz Bass, Burns Sonic Bass, Fender Bass VI
 Tom Edwards – percussion, timpani, vibraphone, glockenspiel
 Lee Horsley – Hammond, piano, Vox Continental, Fender Rhodes, Farfisa Compact
 Dave Richmond – orchestral bass, Burns Bison Bass
 Scott Baylis – Roland Juno-106, Roland SH-01, Roland JU-06, Roli Seaboard
 Jonny Aitken – drums
 John Coxon – Gibson Firebird
 Alan Wilkinson – saxophones
 Kevin Brown – saxophones
 Kevin Cunningham – trumpet
 Stuart Haugh – trombone
 Jim Walker – violin
 Daniel Thomas – singing
 Lena Wright – singing
 Wendi Rose – singing
 Travis Cole – singing
 Alex Lamey – strings and horns
 Adam Langston – strings and horns

Technical personnel

 J. Spaceman – production, mixing, further production and mixing
 Darren Lawson – mixing
 Guy Massey – recording engineering
 Tom Leach – recording engineering, assistant engineering
 Misha Hering – recording engineering
 Aaron Cupples – recording engineering
 Iggy B – recording engineering
 David Stanley – recording engineering
 Shuta Shinoda – recording engineering
 Darren Lawson – recording engineering
 Oli Bayston – recording engineering
 Emre Ramazanoglu – recording engineering
 Armelle Pignon – assistant engineering
 Ben McCluskey – assistant engineering
 Josh Green – assistant engineering
 Max Prior – assistant engineering
 Tom Leach – assistant engineering
 Noel Summerville – mastering engineering
 Steve Mackey – further production and mixing

Artwork
 Juliette Larthe – photography
 Christina Dunlap – photography
 Travis Waddell – photography
 John Coxon – photography
 Rich Good – photography
 Farrow – design and art direction
 Spaceman – design and art direction

Charts

References 

2018 albums
Spiritualized albums
Bella Union albums
Fat Possum Records albums